Saskatchewan Water Corporation, operating as SaskWater, is a Crown corporation owned by the Government of Saskatchewan and supplies  water, wastewater and related services to municipalities, industries and farms. In turn, municipalities supply water to their residents.  SaskWater has operations in Moose Jaw, Watrous, Prince Albert, Saskatoon, Hanley, Wakaw, Melfort, Regina, Elbow, Gravelbourg and Meota.

See also
Saskatchewan Water Security Agency

References

External links
 SaskWater

Crown corporations of Saskatchewan
Companies based in Saskatchewan
Moose Jaw